Alaska Airlines is a major airline in the United States, headquartered in the Seattle metropolitan area, Washington. , its combined network offers 1,200 flights to more than 115 destinations in the United States, Canada, Mexico, Costa Rica, and Belize under the Alaska Airlines and Horizon Air brands. Its primary hubs are Seattle–Tacoma International Airport, Portland International Airport, Ted Stevens Anchorage International Airport, and Los Angeles International Airport.

The airline was founded in 1932 and during the period of regulation connected numerous airstrips in Alaska to major cities, and the state of Alaska to Seattle. As late as at least 1979, Alaska only served Seattle in the lower 48, though they did offer connecting service to Texas on Braniff International Airlines. Alaska also flew to Portland starting in 1951, but later discontinued the route.

After deregulation in 1978, Alaska began connecting California cities to Seattle. In 1985, the airline first served a state that didn't border the Pacific Ocean, starting service to Boise, Idaho, Phoenix, Arizona, and Tucson, Arizona.

Alaska expanded to Mexico in 1988 and began adding destinations in the Midwestern and Eastern United States in the early 2000s. Alaska's first transcontinental route was to Washington, D.C. in 2001. Competition between Alaska Airlines and Delta Air Lines for control of Seattle resulted in a larger expansion in the 2010s. The acquisition of Virgin America by the Alaska Air Group added service to Dallas Love Field when the brands merged in early 2018.

Alaska started service to the state of Hawaii in 2007. After six years of service they flew 11% of all passenger traffic to the state.

In May 2017, Alaska announced that it would begin flying from Paine Field in Everett, Washington, the first airline to announce scheduled flights from this airport.

Historical destinations
Alaska was the only airline to fly from the west coast of the United States to Havana, Cuba, with a flight from Los Angeles, which operated from 2017 to 2018. After a seasonal drop in demand, and travel restrictions placed by the Trump administration, the route was discontinued a year after launch.

Beginning in 1991, Alaska Airlines operated weekly service to cities in Eastern Russia from Anchorage, Alaska. The service was canceled in 1998 after the Russian financial crisis.

List
The following is a list of destinations that are served or have been served by Alaska Airlines. These do not include destinations flown only by Horizon Air. Previous cities flown solely by Horizon Air include: Arcata-Eureka, Astoria, Butte, Flagstaff, Klamath Falls, Lewiston, Mammoth Lakes, North Bend-Coos Bay, Pendleton, Port Angeles, Prescott, Prince George, Salem, and Twin Falls.

Key

References

Lists of airline destinations
Alaska Air Group
Oneworld destinations
Alaska transportation-related lists